Goldington Road is a rugby ground in the De Parys area of Bedford, Bedfordshire, England. It is the home stadium of Bedford Blues. As of 2019 the stadium holds 5,000 people (down from 6,000). The stadium also has two hospitality boxes, "The Larry Webb Room" and "The Lifesure Suite," which can cater for 12 to 20 people respectively in addition to "The Blues Marquee." There is one stand (the Charles Wells Stand) with the remaining areas being standing room - There is an uncovered temporary stand in the south east corner of the ground.

History
Following an amalgamation between Bedford Rovers (1876) and Bedford Swifts (1882), both with connections to Bedford School and Bedford Modern School, there were two main sites where pitches could be made available. One was known as 'The House of Industry' ground in Goldington Road. This was the field in front of the House of Industry -now known as the North Wing Hospital. This is approximately where Bedford play now. The other site was known as Midland Road Ground, an area near the Queen's Park railway bridge.

The first matches in 1886–87 were in Goldington Road, where the Bedford Swifts had played, but during the next few seasons several pitches near the railway station were used. The railway and industry required this land and Bedford Rugby returned to the Goldington Road area before an agreement in 1895 was reached with Bedford Cricket Club who actually held the lease. The pitch was laid out in virtually the same spot as it is now.

The First World War threatened the club's existence when the ground was taken over by the Military Authorities for use as an Army Camp.

Things did improve very quickly and by the late-1920s and early-1930s further improvements had been made at the ground, the biggest being the stand opened in 1933 which is still in use today.

Following intervention by the RFU in October 1999 a consortium of Bedford businessmen headed by David Ledsom (SDC), Geoff Irvine (Irvine-Whitlock), and David Gunner with assistance from Bedford Borough Council and other professional people, the transfer of the club to Bedford Blues Ltd. was organised.

Several thousand supporters and businesses in the town bought shares and the club is now viable.

Bedford have been playing on virtually the same pitch for over 100 years and 32 players have gained International honours whilst playing for the club at the time of being honoured.

Stands

Towards the end of the 2005–06 season, two new temporary stands were built for the big home tie against Harlequins, at one point these stands were made a long term part of the stadium, along with the grounds public house and original stand. As of the 2006-07 season the extra stands have been removed.

Future
With the introduction of the RFU Championship, clubs will benefit from financial input although it is unknown if Bedford will be in a financial situation to improve the ground or meet the entry requirements into the Premiership since its last entry in 2000.

Pitch
The pitch at Goldington road features a dip in the eastern corner which causes difficulties to visiting teams who struggle to read the surface. Furthermore, there is a gradient again going down from west to east.

See also
List of rugby union stadiums by capacity
List of English rugby league stadiums by capacity
List of European stadiums by capacity

References

Sport in Bedford
Sports venues in Bedfordshire
Sports venues completed in 1886
Buildings and structures in Bedford